The Smithsonian Institution's Global Volcanism Program (GVP) documents Earth's volcanoes and their eruptive history over the past 10,000 years. The mission of the GVP is to document, understand, and disseminate information about global volcanic activity.

Global Volcanism Program Database
The GVP gathers information and reports on current eruptions from around the world, and maintains a database repository on active volcanoes, their eruptions and their eruption histories. In this way, a global context for the planet's active volcanism is presented. Smithsonian reporting on current volcanic activity dates back to 1968, with the Center for Short-Lived Phenomena (CSLP). The GVP is housed in the Department of Mineral Sciences, part of the National Museum of Natural History, on the National Mall in Washington, D.C. 

During the early stages of an eruption, the GVP acts as a clearing house of reports, data, and imagery which are accumulated from a global network of contributors. The early flow of information is managed such that the right people are contacted as well as helping to sort out vague and contradictory aspects that typically arise during the early days of an eruption.

The Weekly Volcanic Activity Report  is a cooperative project between the Smithsonian's Global Volcanism Program and the United States Geological Survey's Volcano Hazards Program. Notices of volcanic activity posted on the report website are preliminary and subject to change as events are studied in more detail. Detailed reports on various volcanoes are published monthly in the Bulletin of the Global Volcanism Network

The GVP also documents the last 10,000 years of Earth's volcanism. The GVP database includes all known volcanoes that have erupted within the past 10,000 years, and includes listings of eruption dates, and eruptive phenomena; and lists of named volcanoes and volcanic features, with synonyms where they exist. In recent years, the database has been extended to include links to digital imagery, and physical samples that are archived in the Smithsonian Institution Collections.  The historic activity can guide perspectives on possible future events and on volcanoes showing activity. GVP's volcano and eruption databases constitute a foundation for all statistical statements concerning locations, frequencies, and magnitudes of Earth's volcanic eruptions during the past recent 10,000 years.

Three print editions of Volcanoes of the World were published based on the GVP data in 1981, 1994 and 2010.

See also

Prediction of volcanic activity
Timeline of volcanism on Earth
Volcanic explosivity index
Volcano Number

References

External links
Global Volcanism Program
Global Volcanism Program Facebook page

Volcanology
Smithsonian Institution research programs